Supracristal plane (Planum supracristale) (or supracrestal plane) is an anatomical transverse plane lying at the upper most part of the pelvis, the iliac crest. This is usually at the level of the L4 vertebrae. It passes through the umbilical region and the left and right lumbar regions.

Clinical significance
The supracristal plane can be used as a landmark for several nerve branches, as well as an approximate marker for the umbilicus (belly button). It is also used as the divider between the lower (left and right) and  upper (left and right) quadrants of the abdomen (where the vertical midline divides left from right).

It is also the level where the abdominal aorta bifurcates into the left and right common iliac artery and just superior to the union of the common iliac veins.

It can help in the identification of the level of L4/L5 where a lumbar puncture can be done.

References

Pelvis
Anatomical planes